Sorkh Deh is a village in Rudbar Rural District, in the Central District of Damghan County, Semnan Province, Iran. At the 2006 census, its population was 111, in 36 families.

References 

Populated places in Damghan County